S2600 may refer to:

 a server model by NCR Corporation
 Coolpix S2600, a digital camera model by Nikon